Pentalofos ( meaning the five hills) is a village in the northern part of the Evros regional unit in Greece. Pentalofos is in the municipal unit of Orestiada.  In 2011 its population was 510. It is close to the border with Bulgaria. The nearest larger village is Ormenio to its north.

Population

See also

List of settlements in the Evros regional unit

External links
Pentalofos on GTP Travel Pages

References

Populated places in Evros (regional unit)